Charmaine Jordan (born May 15, 1988), known professionally as Charm La'Donna, is an American dancer and choreographer. She is considered "one of the most sought-after dancers and creative directors of her generation," and is known for her work with recording artists such as Kendrick Lamar, Rosalía, Dua Lipa and Selena Gomez.

Early life and education 
La'Donna was born Charmaine Jordan on May 15, 1988, in Compton, California. She has an older brother, Yki, and was raised by her mother, Debbie. She credits her mother, grandmother and "the village of women in Compton, all connected by blood, friendship or simply proximity" for her success. Yki is a rapper and songwriter who inspired La'Donna to pursue a recording career of her own. After he was arrested and sentenced for 75 years to life in prison, she suspended those dreams and turned to dancing.

After telling her mother at the age of 3 that she wanted to become a dancer, La'Donna was enrolled in a recreational center in Compton that offered dance activities. Counselors at the center referred her to Regina's School of the Arts, where she trained before moving to Miss Monica's Dance School. When she was 10, La'Donna was introduced to dancer and choreographer Fatima Robinson while auditioning for a music video for rapper Mase. She quickly recognized her talents and began mentoring her. La'Donna attended the Los Angeles County High School for the Arts (LACSHA), where she graduated from in 2006. She holds a Bachelor of Arts in world arts and culture from the University of California, Los Angeles (UCLA).

Career 
During her senior year at LACSHA, La'Donna was hired by singer Madonna as a backup dancer for her Confessions Tour. Following the tour, she worked as Robinson's assistant choreographer, working on various music videos, television specials and Super Bowl halftime shows under her direction while attending UCLA full-time. Her work with Robinson introduced her to fellow Compton native, rapper Kendrick Lamar, while co-choreographing his performance at the 2015 BET Awards. He recruited her in 2017 as the choreographer and sole female dancer for his DAMN. Tour and choreographed and danced in his opening performance at the 60th Annual Grammy Awards in 2018. La'Donna continued to gain recognition by choreographing music videos and live performances for singers Rosalía, Selena Gomez, Dua Lipa and Meghan Trainor. Her work in the music video for Rosalía, J Balvin and El Guincho's "Con altura" won her the MTV Video Music Award for Best Choreography. She was the sole choreographer for singer the Weeknd's Super Bowl LV halftime show.

La'Donna's music aspirations resumed in 2020. She signed a recording contract with Epic Records in February and released her first two singles "So & So" and "Westside". Her debut extended play, La'Donna, was released on April 9, 2021.

Filmography

Film

Television

Music videos

As lead artist

As choreographer

Discography

Extended plays (EP) 

 La'Donna (2021)

References

External links 

 
 

1988 births
Living people
21st-century American dancers
21st-century American rappers
African-American choreographers
American choreographers
African-American female dancers
American hip hop singers
American music video directors
Creative directors
Dancers from California
Epic Records artists
Los Angeles County High School for the Arts alumni
Musicians from Compton, California
People from Compton, California
Rappers from California
Songwriters from California
University of California, Los Angeles alumni